The 2012 Cup of China was the third event of six in the 2012–13 ISU Grand Prix of Figure Skating, a senior-level international invitational competition series. It was held at the Shanghai Oriental Sports Center in Shanghai on November 2–4. Medals were awarded in the disciplines of men's singles, ladies' singles, pair skating, and ice dancing. Skaters earned points toward qualifying for the 2012–13 Grand Prix Final.

Eligibility
Skaters who reached the age of 14 by July 1, 2012 were eligible to compete on the senior Grand Prix circuit.

Prior to competing in a Grand Prix event, skaters were required to have earned the following scores (3/5 of the top scores at the 2012 World Championships):

Entries
The entries were as follows.

Overview
Carolina Kostner withdrew from the ladies' event due to insufficient fitness. Due to the 2012 China anti-Japanese demonstrations, the Japan Skating Federation said it would withdraw its competitors if the organizers did not provide security guarantees. Japan's pair Narumi Takahashi / Mervin Tran withdrew in order to undergo surgery. Satisfied with the security situation, the other Japanese skaters traveled to the event.

Although eight spots were available in the pairs event, only six teams competed due to withdrawals before the start of the competition. China's home team of Pang Qing / Tong Jian won the short program, followed by Russia's Yuko Kavaguti / Alexander Smirnov and Canada's Kirsten Moore-Towers / Dylan Moscovitch. In the free skate, Pang / Tong maintained their lead to win gold while Kavaguti / Smirnov took the silver and fellow Russian pair Ksenia Stolbova / Fedor Klimov rose from fifth to win the bronze, their first senior Grand Prix medal.

In the ice dancing event, World bronze medalists Nathalie Pechalat / Fabian Bourzat of France won the short dance ahead of Canada's Kaitlyn Weaver / Andrew Poje and Russia's Ekaterina Bobrova / Dmitri Soloviev. Pechalat / Bourzat maintained their lead in the free dance and took their third GP gold by over ten points over Bobrova / Soloviev, with Weaver / Poje 0.49 points behind in third.

In the ladies' event, World Junior champion Yulia Lipnitskaya of Russia won the short program ahead of two-time World Champion Mao Asada of Japan. Asada won the title after placing first in the free skate ahead of Lipnitskaia, whose silver was her first senior Grand Prix medal, while Finland's Kiira Korpi won the bronze. China's Geng Bingwa withdrew after the short program due to a sprained ankle.

In the men's event, Japan's Daisuke Takahashi won the short program over countryman Tatsuki Machida, with Russia's Sergei Voronov in third. Machida upset former World champion Takahashi to win his first senior Grand Prix title. Takahashi settled for silver, with Russia's Sergei Voronov winning the bronze, his first Grand Prix medal since 2010. Although ten spots were available in the men's event, the field was reduced to nine before the start of the competition and finished with seven due to withdrawals after the short program. China's Song Nan withdrew after sustaining a concussion in a collision with American Adam Rippon a minute into the final warm up before the free skate. Rippon said, "I kind of turned around to go into a jump and I think when Nan Song and I saw each other we both tried to avoid each other, but we went in the same way and we went head first into each other." Song was kept in the hospital overnight for observation. France's Brian Joubert withdrew due to abdominal pain and fever – his coach said he had passed out three times on the flight to China.

Results

Men

Ladies

Pairs

Ice dancing

References

External links
 Entries
 2012 Cup of China

Cup of China, 2012
Cup of China
Cup
Sports competitions in Shanghai